Chennai, formerly known as Madras, is the capital city of Tamil Nadu, the southernmost Indian state. It is the state's primate city both in area and population and is located on the Coromandel Coast of the Bay of Bengal. According to the 2011 Indian census, Chennai is the sixth-most populous city in India and forms the fourth-most populous urban agglomeration. The Greater Chennai Corporation is the civic body responsible for the city; it is the oldest city corporation of India, established in 1688—the second oldest in the world after London.

Historically, Chennai and surroundings were part of the Chola, Pandya, Pallava and Vijayanagara kingdoms for many centuries. The coastal land, which then contained the fishing village Madrasapattinam, was purchased by the British East India Company from the Nayak ruler Damarla Chennapa Nayaka, in the 17th century. The British garrison established the Madras city and port, and built Fort St. George—the first British fortress in India—which the French won over briefly in 1746, before becoming the winter capital of the Madras Presidency, a colonial province of the British Raj in the Indian subcontinent. After India gained its independence in 1947, Madras continued as the capital city of the Madras State and present-day Tamil Nadu. The city was officially renamed as Chennai in 1996.

The city is coterminous with Chennai district, which together with the adjoining suburbs constitutes the Chennai Metropolitan Area, the 36th-largest urban area in the world by population and one of the largest metropolitan economies of India. As the traditional and de facto gateway of South India, Chennai is among the most-visited Indian cities by foreigners. It was ranked the 43rd most-visited city in the world in 2015 and 36th in 2019. The Quality of Living Survey rates it as India's safest city. Chennai attracts 45 percent of health tourists visiting India, and 30 to 40 percent of domestic health tourists. As such, it is termed "India's health capital". Chennai has the fifth-largest urban economy, and had the third-largest expatriate population in India.

Ranked as a beta-level city in the Global Cities Index, Chennai was dubbed India's best city by India Today in 2014. It was named the "hottest" city (city worth visiting and worth living in for long term) by the BBC in 2015, citing its amalgam of both modern and traditional values. It was the only South Asian city to feature on National Geographic's "Top 10 food cities" in 2015, and ranked ninth on Lonely Planet's best cosmopolitan cities of the world. In October 2017, Chennai was added to the UNESCO Creative Cities Network (UCCN) list for its rich musical tradition. Chennai hosts more than one-third of India's automobile industry, and is a major film production center, home to the Tamil film industry.

Etymology 

The name Chennai was derived from the name of Damarla Mudirasa Chennappa Nayakudu, father of Damarla Venkatapathy Nayak, a Nayak ruler who served as a general under Venkata III of the Vijayanagara Empire from whom the British acquired the town in 1639. As such, the city's name is of Telugu language origin. The first official use of the name Chennai is said to be in a sale deed, dated August 1639, to Francis Day of the East India Company, even before the Chennakesava Perumal Temple was built in 1646, while some scholars argue to the contrary.

The name Madras is also of native origin, and has been shown to have been in use before the British established a presence in India. A Vijayanagara-era inscription dated to the year 1367 that mentions the port of Mādarasanpattanam, along with other small ports on the east coast, was discovered in 2015 and it was theorised that the aforementioned port is the fishing port of Royapuram. According to some sources, Madras is derived from Madraspattinam, a fishing village north of Fort St George. However, it is uncertain whether the name was in use before the arrival of Europeans. British military mapmakers believed Madras was originally Mundir-raj or Mundiraj, which was the name of a Telugu community, Mudiraj, who were the native inhabitants of the city.

There are also suggestions that it may have originated from the Portuguese phrase Mãe de Deus or Madre de Dios, which means "mother of God", due to Portuguese influence on the port city, specifically referring to a Church of St. Mary.

In August 1996, the Government of Tamil Nadu officially changed the name from Madras to Chennai. At that time many Indian cities underwent a change of name. However, the name Madras continues in occasional use for the city, as well as for places named after the city such as University of Madras, IIT Madras, Madras Institute of Technology, Madras Medical College, Madras Veterinary College, Madras Christian College.

History

Stone age implements have been found near Pallavaram in Chennai. According to the Archaeological Survey of India (ASI), Pallavaram was a megalithic cultural establishment, and pre-historic communities resided in the settlement.

The region around Chennai has served as an important administrative, military, and economic centre for many centuries. During the 1st century CE, a poet and weaver named Thiruvalluvar lived in the town of Mylapore (a neighbourhood of present Chennai). From the 1st–12th century the region of present Tamil Nadu and parts of South India was ruled by the Cholas.

The Pallavas of Kanchi built the areas of Mahabalipuram and Pallavaram during the reign of Mahendravarman I. They also defeated several kingdoms including the Cheras, Cholas and Pandyas who ruled over the area before their arrival. Sculpted caves and paintings have been identified from that period. Ancient coins dating to around 500 BCE have also been unearthed from the city and its surrounding areas. A portion of these findings belonged to the Vijayanagara Empire, which ruled the region during the medieval period.

The Portuguese first arrived in 1522 and built a port called São Tomé after the Christian apostle, St. Thomas, who is believed to have preached in the area between 52 and 70 CE. In 1612, the Dutch established themselves near Pulicat, north of Chennai.

On 20 August 1639 Francis Day of the East India Company along with the Nayak of Kalahasti Damarla Chennappa Nayakudu, travelled to the Chandragiri palace for an audience with the Vijayanager Emperor Peda Venkata Raya. Day was seeking to obtain a grant for land on the Coromandel coast on which the company could build a factory and warehouse for their trading activities. On 22 August, he secured the land grant from local Nayak (Damarla Venkatadri Nayaka and his younger brother Aiyappa Nayaka of Poonamallee). The region was then formerly a fishing village known as "Madraspatnam". A year later, the Company built Fort St. George, the first major English settlement in India, which became the nucleus of the growing colonial city and urban Chennai, grew around this Fort. Post independence the fort housed the Tamil Nadu Assembly until the new Secretariat building was opened in 2010, but shortly afterwards it was again moved back to Fort St. George, due to a change in the Government.

In 1746, Fort St. George and Madras were captured by the French under General La Bourdonnais, the Governor of Mauritius, who plundered the town and its outlying villages. The British regained control in 1749 through the Treaty of Aix-la-Chapelle and strengthened the town's fortress wall to withstand further attacks from the French and Hyder Ali, the Sultan of Mysore. They resisted a French siege attempt in 1759. In 1769 the city was threatened by Mysore and the British were defeated by Hyder Ali, after which the Treaty of Madras ended the war. By the 18th century, the British had conquered most of the region around Tamil Nadu and the northern modern–day states of Andhra Pradesh and Karnataka, establishing the Madras Presidency with Madras as the capital.

Gradually, the city grew into a major naval base and became the central administrative centre for the British in South India. The city served as the baseline for the Great Trigonometrical Survey of India started on 10 April 1802. With the advent of railways in India in the 19th century, the thriving urban centre was connected to other important cities such as Bombay and Calcutta, promoting increased communication and trade with the hinterland. Sir Arthur Lawley was Governor of Madras from 1906 to 1911 and promoted modern agriculture, industry, railways, education, the arts and more democratic governance. The Governor lived in Government House, Fort St George, and had a country home at Guindy, with access to a golf course, hockey pitches, riding stables and the Guindy Horse Racing Track. In the First World War as Red Cross Commissioner in Mesopotamia, he looked after the welfare of Indian soldiers. Madras was the only Indian city to be attacked by the Central Powers during World War I, when an oil depot was shelled by the German light cruiser  on 22 September 1914, as it raided shipping lanes in the Indian Ocean, causing disruption to shipping.

After India gained its independence in 1947, the city became the capital of Madras State, which was renamed as Tamil Nadu in 1969. The violent agitations of 1965 against the compulsory imposition of Hindi and in support of English in India in the state marked a major shift in the political dynamics of the city and eventually it had a big impact on the whole state. Because of Madras and its people, English was not abolished as an official language, and remains an official language of India alongside Hindi. On 17 July 1996, the city known as Madras was officially renamed Chennai, in line with what was then a nationwide trend to using less Anglicised names. On 26 December 2004, an Indian Ocean tsunami lashed the shores of Chennai, killing 206 people in Chennai and permanently altering the coastline.

Environment

Geography

Chennai is located on the south–eastern coast of India in the north–eastern part of Tamil Nadu on a flat coastal plain known as the Eastern Coastal Plains. Two major rivers flow through Chennai, the Cooum River (or Koovam) through the centre and the Adyar River to the south. A third river, the Kortalaiyar, travels through the northern fringes of the city before draining into the Bay of Bengal, at Ennore. The estuary of this river is heavily polluted with effluents released by the industries in the region. Adyar and Cooum rivers are heavily polluted with effluents and waste from domestic and commercial sources, the Coumm being so heavily polluted it is regarded as the city's eyesore. A protected estuary on the Adyar forms a natural habitat for several species of birds and animals. The Otteri Nullah, an east–west stream, runs through north Chennai and meets the Buckingham Canal at Basin Bridge. Several lakes of varying size are located on the western fringes of the city. Some areas of the city have the problem of excess iron content in groundwater.

Chennai's soil is mostly clay, shale and sandstone. Clay underlies most of the city, chiefly Manali, Kolathur, Maduravoyal, K. K. Nagar, Tambaram, Mudichur, Pallavaram Semmencherry, Alapakkam, Vyasarpadi and Anna Nagar. Sandy areas are found along the river banks and coasts, and include areas such as Tiruvottiyur, George Town, Madhavaram, New Washermanpet, Chepauk, Mylapore, Porur, Adyar, Besant Nagar and Uthandi. In these areas, rainwater runoff percolates quickly through the soil. Areas having hard rock surface include Guindy, Nanganallur, Pallikaranai, Alandur, Jaladampet, Velachery, Adambakkam and a part of Saidapet and Perungudi. The ground water table in Chennai is at 4–5 m below ground in most of the areas, which was considerably improved and maintained through the mandatory rain water harvesting system. Of the 24.87 km coastline of the city, 3.08 km experiences erosion, with sand accretion along the shoreline can be noticed at the Marina beach and the area between the Ennore Port and Kosasthalaiyar river.

Geology
Chennai is classified as being in Seismic Zone III, indicating a moderate risk of damage from earthquakes. Owing to the geotectonic zone the city falls in, the city is considered a potential geothermal energy site. The crust has granite rocks indicating volcanic activities in the past. It is expected that temperatures of around 200 to 300 C° will be available if the ground were drilled 4 to 5 km deep. The region has the oldest rocks in the country dating back to nearly a billion years.

Flora and fauna

The southern stretch of Chennai's coast from Tiruvanmiyur to Neelangarai are favoured by the endangered olive ridley sea turtles to lay eggs every winter. A large number of cattle egrets, pond herons and other waterbirds can be seen in the rivers of Cooum and Adyar. About 75,000 birds migrate to Chennai every year. Marshy wetlands such as Pallikaranai also play host to a number of migratory birds during the monsoon and winter. Over 300 species of birds have been recorded in the city and its neighbourhood by members of Madras Naturalists' Society since its inception in 1978.

Guindy National Park is a protected area within the city limits. Wildlife conservation and research activities take place at
Arignar Anna Zoological Park including olive ridley sea turtle conservation. The city's tree cover is estimated to be around 64.06 sq km. The most dominant tree species is the copper pod, followed by Indian beech and Neem. A total of 121 species of trees belonging to 94 genera and 42 families are found in the city. Nearly half of the native plant species in the city's wetlands have disappeared in recent years. The city, which had 85 percent of its area covered with aquatic plants until the 1970s, now has only 25 percent of its area covered with such plants.

Environment conservation

Chennai has three rivers and many lakes spread across the city. Urbanization has led to the shrinkage of water bodies and wetlands. The quantity of wetlands in the city has decreased from 650 to only 27 currently. The Chennai River Restoration trust set up by the government is working on the restoration of Adyar river. Environmentalist Foundation of India is a volunteering group working towards wildlife conservation and habitat restoration.

The encroachment of urban development on wetlands has gravely hampered the city's sustainability, and contributed both to the city's floods in 2015 and water scarcity crisis in 2019.

Climate
Chennai has a dry-summer tropical wet and dry climate under the (Köppen climate classification). The city lies on the thermal equator and is also on the coast, which prevents extreme variation in seasonal temperature.

The city gets most of its seasonal rainfall from the north–east monsoon winds, from mid–October to mid–December. Cyclones in the Bay of Bengal sometimes hit the city. Prevailing winds in Chennai are usually southwesterly between April and October and north-easterly during the rest of the year. Historically, Chennai has relied on the annual rains of the monsoon season to replenish water reservoirs, as no major rivers flow through the area. Chennai has a water table at 2 metres for 60 percent of the year. The city of Chennai is located on the east coast of India, which is also known as the Coromandel Coast.
Chennai is largely dependent on NE monsoon, since 65% of rains are received in this season. Cyclones and depressions are common features during the season. Cyclones, in particular, are especially unpredictable. They may even move towards Orissa, west Bengal, Bangladesh, and also Myanmar. The season between October and December is referred as the NE monsoon period. Floods are common during this period. In 2015, Chennai received record-breaking rains since 1918, which caused massive floods.

Land usage
As of 2018, the city had a green cover of 14.9 percent, against the World Health Organization recommendation of 9 square metres of green cover per capita in cities. The city had a built-up area of 71 percent. Waterbodies cover an estimated 6 percent of the total area, and at least 8 percent of the area has classified as open space. As of 2017, the total volume of water harvested was 339 mcft and groundwater recharge was 170 mcft.

Administration

Chennai city is governed by the Greater Chennai Corporation (formerly "Corporation of Madras"), which was established in 1688. It is the oldest surviving municipal corporation in India and the second oldest surviving corporation in the world. The corporation is headed by a mayor, an office presently occupied by Priya Rajan. The Mayor and councillors of the city are elected through a popular vote by the residents. While the city limit was expanded in 2011, the revised population is yet to be officially announced.

The larger suburbs are governed by town municipalities and the smaller ones are governed by town councils called panchayats. Under the gamut of the CMDA are 5 parliamentary and 28 assembly constituencies. The CMDA has drafted an additional Master Plan that aims to develop satellite townships around the city. The city's contiguous satellite towns include Mahabalipuram in the south, Chengalpattu and Maraimalai Nagar in the southwest, and Sriperumpudur, Arakkonam, Kanchipuram and Tiruvallur to the west.

Chennai, as the capital of the state of Tamil Nadu, houses the state executive and legislative headquarters primarily in the Secretariat Buildings in the Fort St George campus. The Madras High Court, is the highest judicial authority in the state, whose jurisdiction extends across Tamil Nadu and Puducherry. Chennai has three parliamentary constituencies—Chennai North, Chennai Central and Chennai South—and elects 24 Members of the Legislative Assembly (MLAs) to the state legislature.

Law and order

The Greater Chennai Police is the main law enforcement agency in the city, with a jurisdiction of over   catering to over 8.5 million people. It consists of 121 police stations and is headed by a commissioner of police. The Greater Chennai Police is a division of the Tamil Nadu Police, and the administrative control lies with the Tamil Nadu Home Ministry. Chennai City Traffic Police (CCTP) is responsible for the traffic management in the city. The metropolitan suburbs are policed by the Chennai Metropolitan Police, headed by the Chennai Police Commissionerate, and the outer district areas of the CMDA are policed by the Kanchipuram and Thiruvallur police departments.

 (prior to the expansion of Chennai Corporation area), Chennai city has a sanctioned strength of 14,000 police personnel. With a population density of 26,903 persons per square kilometre, the city had 1 policeman for every 413 people. The Chennai suburban police had about 4,093 police personnel and a ratio of 1:1,222. In 2010, the crime rate in the city was 169.2 per 100,000 people, as against an average of 341.9 in the 35 major cities of India. In 2011, North Chennai zone had 30 police stations and 3 police out posts, Central Chennai zone had 28 police stations and 3 police out posts, and South Chennai zone had 30 police stations.

Politics
Since the 19th century, when Western scholars proposed that Dravidian languages, which dominated the southern region of India, formed a different linguistic group to that of the Indo-Aryan languages that are predominant in the north of the subcontinent, the aspects of Tamil nationalism gained prominence. This resulted in the Anti-Hindi agitations in the city and across the state. However, the post-Independence re-organisation of Indian states according to linguistic and ethnic basis has moderated Tamil nationalism, especially the demand for separation from the Indian Union. The Anti-Hindi agitations in mid-1960s made the DMK more popular and more powerful political force in the state. The agitations of the 1960s played a crucial role in the defeat of the Tamil Nadu Congress party in the 1967 elections and the continuing dominance of Dravidian parties in Tamil Nadu politics.

Being the capital of the Madras Province that covered a vast area of the Deccan region, Chennai remained the centre of politics in the southern region of India during the British colonial era. After Independence, it remained the centre of political activities of the state of Tamil Nadu. Chennai is the birthplace of the idea of the Indian National Congress, commonly known as the Congress Party. Founded by Indian and British members of the Theosophical Society movement, most notably A.O. Hume, the idea was originally conceived in a private meeting of 17 men after a Theosophical Convention held in the city in December 1884. During the first 50 years of the Indian National Congress, the city played host to its conferences seven times in 1887, 1894, 1898, 1903, 1908, 1914 and 1927, becoming one of the strong bases for the Indian independence movement. After independence, the city hosted the Congress in 1955 in its suburb of Avadi.

Chennai is also the birthplace of several regional political movements since the British era. South Indian Welfare Association, one of the earliest regional parties, was founded in 1916, which later came to be known as the Justice Party, which was the main opposition party to the Indian National Congress in the state. In 1944, the party was renamed Dravidar Kazhagam (DK) by E. V. Ramasami (popularly known as 'Periyar'). The party was a non-political party that demanded the establishment of an independent state called Dravida Nadu. However, due to the differences between its two leaders Periyar and C. N. Annadurai, the party was split. Annadurai left the party to form the Dravida Munnetra Kazhagam (DMK). The DMK decided to enter into politics in 1956.

Utility services

The city's water supply and sewage treatment are managed by the Chennai MetroWater Supply and Sewage Board. Water is drawn from Red Hills Lake and Chembarambakkam Lake, the primary water reservoirs of the city, and treated at water treatment plants located at Kilpauk, Puzhal, Chembarambakkam and supplied to the city through 27 water distribution stations. The city receives 530 million liters per day (mld) of water from Krishna River through Telugu Ganga project, 180 mld of water from the Veeranam lake project and 100 mld of water from the Minjur desalination plant, the country's largest sea water desalination plant. However, Chennai is predicted to face a huge deficit of 713 mld in 2026 as the demand is projected at 2,248 mld and supply estimated at only 1,535 mld. The city's sewer system was designed in 1910, with some modifications in 1958. There are 714 public toilets in the city managed by the city corporation, and 2,000 more have been planned by the corporation. The corporation also owns 52 community halls across the city.

The Corporation of Chennai provides civic services to the city. Garbage collection in some of the wards is contracted to Ramky Enviro Engineers Limited, a private company, while the Corporation looks after the removal and processing of solid waste in the others, with a superintendent engineer managing the channels. , eight transfer stations exist within the city for treating the waste. Garbage is dumped in two dump-yards in the city—One in Kodungaiyur and another in Pallikaranai, with a major portion of the latter covering the Pallikaranai marshland. In market areas, the conservancy work is done during the night. Electricity is distributed by the Tamil Nadu Electricity Board. Fire services are handled by the Tamil Nadu Fire and Rescue Services. The city, along with the suburbs, has 33 operating fire stations.

The Chennai City region has 568 post offices, of which nearly 460 operate from rented premises.

Architecture

With the history of many neighbourhoods of the city such as Mylapore, Triplicane, and Tiruvanmiyur antedating that of the city itself, the architecture of Chennai ranges in a wide chronology. The oldest buildings in the city date from the 7th and 8th centuries CE, which include the Kapaleeshwarar Temple in Mylapore and the Parthasarathy Temple in Triplicane, built in the Dravidian architecture. This architecture includes various styles, such as those of the Pallavas, the Cholas, and the Vijayanagara empires. The associated Agraharam architecture, which consists of traditional row houses surrounding a temple, can still be seen in these areas. The heritage temples at Mamallapuram at the outskirts of the city are some of the examples of the Pallava architecture. Chennai ranks second to Kolkata in having the largest collection of Indian heritage buildings in the country.

With the advent of the Mugals and the British, the city saw a rise in a blend of Hindu, Islamic and Gothic revival styles, resulting in the distinct Indo-Saracenic architecture. The architecture for several early institutions such as banking and commerce, railways, press and education, chiefly through the colonial rule, followed the earlier directions of the Neo-Classical and the Indo-Saracenic. The Chepauk Palace in the city, designed by Paul Benfield, is said to be the first Indo-Saracenic building in India. Since then, many of the colonial-era buildings in the city were designed in this style of architecture, which is most apparent around the Fort St. George built in 1640. Most of these were designed by English architects Robert Fellowes Chisholm and Henry Irwin. The best examples of this style include the Madras High Court (built in 1892), Southern Railway headquarters, Ripon Building, Government Museum, Senate House of the University of Madras, Amir Mahal, Bharat Insurance Building, Victoria Public Hall and the College of Engineering. The Triumph of Labour, also known as the Labour statue, at the Marina Beach is an important landmark of Chennai.

The construction of the National Art Gallery in Madras was completed in 1909. The new building, with a distinct façade, was built of pink sandstone brought from Sathyavedu, and formed part of the Madras Museum campus. It was opened, on 23 January 1909, by the Governor of Fort St. George, Sir Arthur Lawley, and called the Victoria Memorial Hall after the Queen-Empress Victoria. The residential architecture in the city was based on the bungalow or the continuous row house prototypes. Gothic revival style buildings include the Chennai Central and Chennai Egmore railway stations. The Santhome Church, which was originally built by the Portuguese in 1523 and is believed to house the remains of the apostle St. Thomas, was rebuilt in 1893 in neo-Gothic style.

By the early 20th century, the art deco too made its entry upon the city's urban landscape. From the 1930s onwards, many buildings in George Town were built in this style, including the United India building (presently housing the Life Insurance Corporation of India (LIC)) and the Burma Shell building (presently the Chennai House), both built in the 1930s, and the Dare House, built in 1940. Other examples include the Bombay Mutual building (presently housing LIC) and the South Indian Chamber of Commerce building. After Independence, the city witnessed a rise in the Modernism style of architecture. The completion of the LIC Building in 1959, the tallest building in the country at that time, marked the transition from lime-and-brick construction to concrete columns in the region. The presence of the weather radar at the Chennai Port, however, prohibited the construction of buildings taller than 60 m around a radius of 10 km for several decades that followed. In addition, the floor-area ratio (FAR) in the central business district is also 1.5, much less than that of smaller cities of the country. This resulted in the city expanding horizontally, unlike other metropolitan cities where vertical growth was prominent. On the contrary, the peripheral regions, especially on the southern and south-western sides, began experiencing vertical growth with the construction of buildings up to 60 floors. Within the downtown area, the 48-storied Highliving District Tower H remains the tallest building at 161 metres.

Demographics

Population

A resident of Chennai is called a Chennaite. According to 2011 census, the city had a population of 4,646,732, within an area of 174 square kilometres administered by the Municipal Corporation, working out a population density of 26,705 persons per square kilometre; that had 11 lakh households, with 51% of them living in rented houses. The city's limits were expanded later in 2011 to 426 square kilometres and its population reached 7,088,000, resulting in a population density of 16,639 persons per square kilometre, with Chennai Municipal Corporation being renamed as Greater Chennai Corporation.

As of 2019, 712,000 families live below poverty line, which is about 40 percent of the 1.788 million families in the city.

Languages
Tamils form the majority of Chennai's population. English is spoken largely by white-collar workers, often mixed into Tamil. In 2001, out of the 2,937,000 migrants (33.8% of its population) in the city, 61.5% were from other parts of the state, 33.8% were from rest of India and 3.7% were from outside the country. As per the 2001 census, the number of speakers mother tongue wise are as follows, Tamil is spoken by 3,424,107 (78.8%), followed by Telugu by 419,209 (9.7%), Urdu by 180,245 (4.1%), Malayalam by 113,828 (2.6%), Hindi by 104,084 (2.4%), and Kannada by 22,250 (0.5%). Korean, Japanese, French, Mandarin Chinese, Russian, German and Spanish are some of the languages spoken by the 250,000 foreign expatriates residing in the city.

Religion and ethnicity

Chennai, along with Bengaluru, Mumbai and Delhi, is one of the few Indian cities that are home to a diverse population of ethno-religious communities. Minorities include Telugus, Marwaris, Gujaratis, Parsis, Sindhis, Odias, Goans, Kannadigas, Anglo-Indians, Bengalis, Punjabi, and Malayalees. As per the religious census of 2011, Chennai's population was 80.73% Hindu, 9.45% Muslim, 7.72% Christian, 1.11% Jain, 0.06% Sikh, 0.06% Buddhist, <0.04% followed other religions and 0.83% followed no religion or did not indicate any religious preference.

Housing

In a 2013 survey titled 'Emerging trends in real estate in Asia Pacific 2014', Chennai emerged in the top 25 real estate destinations list in the Asia Pacific region. The city ranked 22nd in the list. There are about 1,240 slums in Chennai home to about 900,000 people.

Per 2011 census, there are 1.1 million households in the city and the residential housing stock available is 1,150,000 – a surplus of about 50,000 houses. About 43,700 of them are kept vacant. In the suburbs of Chennai located in Tiruvallur and Kancheepuram districts, the figures of vacant houses 56,000 and 71,000, respectively. Of the existing housing stock in the city, about 200,000 houses are not in good condition, necessitating either to rebuild or build new units. About 26,000 households live in houses without any room and another 427,000 families (with an average size of five members) live in small dwelling units with only one room. An earlier estimate shows that there is a need to generate about 420,000 units for low-income groups by 2016.

, an estimated population of 11,116 (0.16 percent) were homeless. Per Supreme Court guidelines, the city needs 65 shelters for the homeless. However, it has only 15, of which eight are functioning and two are under renovation.

As of 2017, there are more than 2.2 million households, with 40 percent of the residents not owning a house.

Arts and culture

Museums and art galleries

Chennai is home to many museums, galleries, and other institutions, many of which are free of admission charges and are major tourist attractions as well as playing a research role. The city also has one of the oldest museums and art galleries in the countryGovernment Museum, Chennai and The National Art Gallery (Chennai), established in the early 18th century.

The city also hosts two art festivals annually. The "Fort Museum" inside the premises of Fort St. George is an important museum having a noteworthy collection of objects of the British era in its collection. The museum is managed by the Archaeological Survey of India and has in its possession, the first Flag of India hoisted at Fort St George after the declaration of India's Independence on 15 August 1947.

Music and performing arts

Chennai is a major centre for music, art and culture in India. The city is known for its classical dance shows. In 1930, for the first time in India, Madras University introduced a course of music, as part of the Bachelor of Arts curriculum. The Madras Music Season, initiated by Madras Music Academy in 1927, is celebrated every year during the month of December. It features performances of traditional Carnatic music by many artists in and around the city. The main folk music in Chennai is Gaana, a combination of various folk musics sung mainly sung in the working-class area of North Chennai.

An arts festival called the Chennai Sangamam, which showcases not only various art of Tamil Nadu, but also from the neighbouring states, like kalari (from Kerala), which is a major attraction, is held in January every year. The Speciality of Chennai Sangamam is that the various programmes are held near or at the various famous landmarks in the city so that everyone in the city has access to the programmes and there is no fee charged for entry for any of the programmes. Pookolam, a form of art that uses coloured flour to create patterns and designs, comes from Kerala, but can be seen in abundance at the time of Onam.

The city has a diverse theatre scene and is one of the important centres for Bharata Natyam, a classical dance form that originated in Tamil Nadu and is the oldest dance of India. An important cultural centre for Bharata Natyam is Kalakshetra, on the beach in the south of the city. In 2012, a group of five Bharatha Natyam dancers from Chennai performed at the India Campaign during the 2012 Summer Olympics.
Chennai has been featured in UNESCO Creative Cities Network (UCCN) list since October 2017 for its century-old musical tradition. Chennai is also home to some choirs, who during the Christmas season stage various carol performances across the city in Tamil and English.

Cityscape

Chennai is broadly divided into four regions: North, Central, South, and West. North Chennai is primarily an industrial area, with a higher population density and narrower roads. South and West Chennai, previously mostly residential, are rapidly becoming commercial, home to a growing number of information technology firms, financial companies and call centres. The city is expanding quickly along the Old Mahabalipuram Road and the Grand Southern Trunk Road (GST Road) in the south and towards Ambattur, Koyambedu and Sriperumbdur in the west. Central Chennai comprises residential elements, but is primarily home to the downtown area, and surrounding areas, the most visited by travellers to the city.

Economy

Recent estimates of the economy of the entire Chennai Metropolitan Area range from $78.6 to $86 billion (PPP GDP), ranking it from fourth- to sixth-most productive metro area of India. Chennai has a broad industrial base in the automobile, computer, technology, hardware manufacturing and healthcare sectors. , the city is India's second-largest exporter of information technology (IT) and business process outsourcing (BPO) services. A major part of India's automobile industry is located in and around the city thus earning it the nickname "Detroit of India". Known as the "Gateway of South India", Chennai is the third-most visited city in India by international tourists according to Euromonitor. The city is also called the Cultural Capital of South India. The city was home to the Madras Stock Exchange, India's fourth stock exchange, one of four permanently recognised by SEBI, and India's third-largest by trading volume, ranked behind the Bombay Stock Exchange and the National Stock Exchange of India.

Industrialisation in the city dates back to the 16th century, when textile mills manufactured goods which were exported to British during its war with France. According to Forbes magazine, Chennai is one of the fastest-growing cities in the world and is ranked among the "Forbes-Top 10 Fastest Growing Cities in the World". It is ranked 4th in hosting the maximum number of Fortune 500 companies of India, next only to Mumbai, Delhi and Kolkata. It also is home to 24 Indian companies having a net worth of more than US$1 billion. , the city has about 34,260 identified companies in its 15 zones, of which 5,196 companies have a paid-up the capital of over  50 lakh.

Chennai has a diversified economic base anchored by the automobile, software services, hardware manufacturing, health care and financial services industries. According to the Confederation of Indian Industry, Chennai is estimated to grow to a US$100 billion economy, 2.5 times its present size, by 2025. , with  1 lakh crore investment in the pipeline over 5 years, the city is poised for major industrial investment. Chennai is classified as a global city by GaWC, with a ranking of Beta based on the extent of global reach and financial influence. It is estimated that about 400 financial industry businesses are headquartered in the city, half of which are located in the areas of Mylapore, R. A. Puram, Nungambakkam and T. Nagar.

The city is base to around 40 percent of India's automobile industry and 45 percent of auto components industry. A large number of automotive companies including Royal enfield, Hyundai, Renault, Robert Bosch, Nissan Motors, Ashok Leyland, Yamaha Motor, Daimler AG, Caterpillar Inc., Komatsu Limited, BharatBenz, Ford, BMW, Citroën and Mitsubishi have manufacturing plants in Chennai. The Heavy Vehicles Factory at Avadi produces military vehicles, including India's main battle tank: Arjun MBT. The Integral Coach Factory manufactures railway coaches and other rolling stock for Indian Railways. The Ambattur–Padi industrial zone houses many textile manufacturers, and a special economic zone (SEZ) for apparel and footwear manufacturing has been set up in the southern suburbs of the city. Chennai contributes more than 50 percent of India's leather exports.

Many software and software services companies have development centres in Chennai, which contributed 14 percent of India's total software exports of  14,42,140 lakh during 2006–07, making it the second largest Indian city software exporter following Bangalore. The Tidel Park in Chennai was billed as Asia's largest IT park when it was built. Major software companies have their offices set up here, with some of them making Chennai their largest base.

Prominent financial institutions, including the World Bank, Standard Chartered Bank, ABN AMRO, Bank of America, The Royal Bank of Scotland, Goldman Sachs, Barclays, HSBC, ING Group, Allianz, Sumitomo Mitsui Banking Corporation, The Bank of Tokyo-Mitsubishi UFJ, Abu Dhabi Commercial Bank, Asian Development Bank, Credit Suisse, BNP Paribas Fortis, Irevna, Deutsche Bank and Citibank have back office and development centre operations in the city. Chennai is home to the national level commercial banks Indian Bank and Indian Overseas Bank and many state level co–operative banks, finance and insurance companies. Telecom and Electronics manufacturers based in and around Chennai include Samsung, Nokia Siemens, Motorola, Lenovo, Dell, Force10, Wipro, Flextronics and Siemens among others. Chennai is currently the largest electronics hardware exporter in India, accounting for 45% of the total exports in 2010–11. Telecom giants Ericsson and Alcatel-Lucent, pharmaceuticals giant Pfizer and chemicals giant Dow Chemicals have research and development facilities in Chennai. The TICEL bio–tech park at Taramani and Golden Jubilee bio–tech park at Siruseri houses biotechnology companies and laboratories. The World Trade Center complex is located at Perungudi on the southern side of the city. According to Jones Lang LaSalle, demand for investment-grade buildings in Chennai is high from IT companies. The average annual gross demand in Chennai is 4.5 million square feet.

A study conducted by the National Housing Bank on the residential price index of Indian cities showed that Chennai experienced the highest growth after the financial crisis of 2007–2008. Medical tourism is an important part of Chennai's economy with 45 percent of total medical tourists to India making to Chennai. The Tamil film industry and the Tamil television industry are also significant parts of Chennai's economy. The city also has a permanent exhibition complex in Nandambakkam called the Chennai Trade Centre. It hosted the Tamil Nadu Global Investors Meet in 2019 which was a business summit organised by the Government of Tamil Nadu. With 385 ultra-rich living in the city as of 2013, Chennai is positioned in the sixth place among Indian cities that are home to the country's super-rich. The city is the third largest market in India for luxury cars.

Banking and finance

The Reserve Bank of India ranked Chennai as third-largest deposit centre and third-largest credit centre nationwide as of June 2012. Prior to the advent of modern commercial banks, the banking services in the city were offered to the public by Nattukottai Chettiars or Nagarathars, chiefly in and around the neighbourhood of George Town, who offered loans as well as accepted money deposits from the public, in addition to offering loans to the agricultural labourers. Even today, many of the banking offices are housed in heritage structures belonging to the colonial era that are chiefly clustered around Rajaji Road in George Town. Chennai is home to the first European-style banking system in India with the establishment of the 'Madras Bank' on 21 June 1683, almost a century before the establishment of the first commercial banks, such as the Bank of Hindustan and the General Bank of India, which were established in 1770 and 1786, respectively. Upon the recommendation of the British Finance Committee on the formation of a government bank, the Madras Bank, then known as the 'Government Bank', started functioning again from 1806. In 1843, the bank merged with the Carnatic Bank (1788), the British Bank of Madras (1795) and the Asiatic Bank (1804) and became the Bank of Madras, which was one of the three Presidency banks of India, the other two being the Bank of Bengal and the Bank of Bombay. In 1921, the three Presidency banks merged to form the Imperial Bank of India, which later became the State Bank of India in 1955.

Chennai is the headquarters of the Indian Bank, the Indian Overseas Bank and the erstwhile Bharat Overseas Bank, which merged with the Indian Overseas Bank in 2007. The city is home to the south zonal office of the Reserve Bank of India, the country's central bank, along with its zonal training centre and Reserve Bank Staff College, one of the two colleges of the bank. The city also houses the permanent back office of the World Bank, which is one of the largest buildings owned by the bank outside its headquarters in Washington, DC. The Chennai office handles corporate financial, accounting, administrative and IT services of the bank, in addition to several value-added operations of the bank that were earlier handled only in its Washington, DC office, including the bank's analytical work in bond valuation which is estimated to be US$100 billion. Several foreign banks have established their branches in the city. The first Sri Lankan Bank in India was established when the Bank of Ceylon opened its branch in Madras on 31 October 1995.

Infrastructure

Communication
Chennai is one of four Indian cities connected to the rest of the world by undersea fibre-optic cables, the other three being Mumbai, Kochi, and Tuticorin. The city is the landing point of major submarine telecommunication cable networks such as SMW4 (connecting India with Western Europe, Middle East and Southeast Asia), i2i (connecting India with Singapore), TIC (connecting India with Singapore), BBG (connecting India with the Sultanate of Oman, Malaysia, the UAE, and Sri Lanka), Gulf Bridge International, and BRICS (connecting India with Brazil, Russia, China and South Africa). The 3,175-km-long, 8-fiber-paired i2i has the world's largest design capacity of 8.4 terabits per second. Work to lay a 2,300-km undersea optical submarine cable connecting Andaman and Nicobar Islands to mainland India through Chennai, carrying 100 Gbit/s optical waves, is slated to begin in December 2019 and completed by March 2020. It will connect Port Blair and the islands of Havelock, Little Andaman (Hutbay), Car Nicobar, Kamorta, Great Nicobar, Long Island and Rangat with Indian mainland.

, eight mobile phone service companies operate seven GSM networks including Airtel, Aircel, BSNL, Vodafone, Tata Docomo GSM, Idea, Reliance GSM and three CDMA networks including MTS, Reliance CDMA, Tata Docomo CDMA in the city. 2G Mobile internet connections are provided by all the operators, and 3G and 4G mobile broadband are provided by few operators in the city. There are four land line companies providing commercial and domestic broadband Internet services. Chennai was the first Indian city to deploy Wi-Fi internet access in a widespread manner. , there were 9.8 million mobile phone users in Chennai. In 2010, Chennai had the fourth highest number of active Internet users in India, with 2.2 million users. As of 2018, the city topped in broadband speed among Indian cities, with a recorded download speed of 32.67 Mbit/s.

Power

Major power plants in the city include North Chennai Thermal Power Station, GMR Vasavi Diesel Power Plant, Ennore Thermal Power Station, Basin Bridge Gas Turbine Power Station, Madras Atomic Power Station and Vallur Thermal Power Project. According to the Tamil Nadu Generation and Distribution Corporation Limited (TANGEDCO), the city consumes about 20 percent of the electricity in the state of Tamil Nadu. The peak evening demand of the city is 1,500 MW which is about 50 percent of the state's peak evening demand of 3,000 megawatt. This includes 37 percent consumption by the industrial sector, 30 percent by the domestic sector, 18 percent by the agricultural sector, and 11.5 percent by the commercial sector. The peak power consumption is for four months between May and August, with the city consuming the highest during June because it is when the summer peaks. On 20 June 2013, the city consumed the highest of 52,785 MU.

, the city consumes around 3.83 crore units of power a day or 1,400 crore units annually. Hourly consumption of power in the city is about 2,000 to 3,000 MW. Availability of power in the city has become a concern in recent years due to increasing demand and slow-paced addition of power plants, due to which scheduled power cuts have become increasingly common. However, this situation was eradicated by the end of 2014. The 426 sq km of the city has over 248,000 streetlights, including 88,000 in the newly expanded areas.

Health care

Chennai is known for its advanced medical facilities, including both government-run and private hospitals. The government-aided hospitals include General Hospital, Adyar Cancer Institute, TB Sanatorium, and National Institute of Siddha. The National Institute of Siddha is one of the seven apex national-level educational institutions that promote excellence in Indian system of medicine and Ayurveda. Major hospitals in Chennai include Apollo Hospitals, Apollo Speciality Hospital, SRM Medical College Hospital and Research Centre, Chettinad Health City, MIOT Hospitals, Sri Ramachandra Medical College and Research Institute, Fortis Malar Hospital, Lifeline Hospitals, Vasan Healthcare, Dr Mehta Hospitals, Global Hospitals & Health City, Sankara Nethralaya and Vijaya Medical & Educational Trust. Chennai attracts about 45 percent of health tourists from abroad and 30 percent to 40 percent of domestic health tourists. The city has been termed India's health capital.

The city has more than 12,500 beds in its hospitals, including about 5,000 in multi-specialty hospitals in the private sector and over 6,000 beds in the public sector. This works to 2.1 beds per 1,000 population against the national average of less than one bed per 1,000 population and the World Health Organization's norms of three beds per 1,000 persons, higher than any other city in the country.

Waste management
The city generates 4,500 tonnes of garbage every day of which 429 tonnes are plastic waste. The city has three dumpyards, one each at Perungudi, Kodungaiyur, and Pallikaranai. The civic body also spends  400 crore a year on solid-waste management.

Tourism and hospitality

With temples, beaches and centres of historical and cultural significance, including the UNESCO Heritage Site of Mahabalipuram, Chennai is one of the most-visited cities in India. The city serves as the gateway to the southern part of India with tourists landing in the city and then visiting the rest of the region. Chennai was the most-visited Indian city by foreign tourists in 2009 and issued the third-highest number of visas on arrival in 2014. In 2011, Chennai was ranked the 41st most visited city, with 3,174,500 tourists, a 14-percent increase from 2010. About 830,620 domestic tourists arrived in Chennai in March 2011. Chennai's leading tourist countries-of-origin are Sri Lanka, Malaysia, Singapore, the United Kingdom, France and the United States. In 2015, the city received 4,243,700 foreign tourists, making it the third-most-visited city in India after Delhi and Mumbai and 43rd-most visited city in the world by foreign tourists. , the city had 21 luxury hotels in the five-star category, with over 4,500 rooms in the inventory. The collective luxury room inventory across four- and five-star categories as of 2018 is around 7,000. About 85 percent of the room demand in Chennai comes from business travellers.

Entertainment

Chennai is the base for Tamil cinema, sometimes nicknamed as Kollywood, alluding to the neighbourhood of Kodambakkam where a number of film studios are located. Many film personalities have gone on to become politicians including C. N. Annadurai, M. Karunanidhi, M. G. Ramachandran and Jayalalithaa. Chennai hosts major film studios, including AVM Productions, the oldest surviving studio in India. , there are 120 cinema screens and multiplexes. Major multiplexes include Sathyam Cinemas, Escape cinemas, Devi and Mayajaal. Chennai's expansive theatre network stages many Tamil plays of many genres: political satire, slapstick comedy, history, mythology and drama. English plays are popular in the city, along with the more common Tamil-language plays.

Recreation

The zoo, beaches and wildlife parks form the primary recreation areas of the city. Chennai has a 19+ km coastline with its corporation limits. The city boasts two popular beaches, the Marina and the Elliot's. The Marina spans   between the deltas of Cooum and Adyar, and is the second-longest urban beach in the world. Elliot's Beach lies south of the Adyar delta. Covelong Beach lies along the Coromandal Coast. The center has one of the world's largest collections of reptiles and has bred 14 of the 23 existing species of crocodiles and alligators. The Arignar Anna Zoological Park, one of the largest zoological parks in the world, annually attracts nearly 2 million visitors. Guindy National Park, a protected area of Tamil Nadu, has a children's park and a snake park, which gained statutory recognition as a medium zoo from the Central Zoo Authority of India in 1995. Chennai is one of the few cities in the world to accommodate a national park, the Guindy National Park, within its limits. An estimated 4.5 percent of the city's area is under green cover. This enables birding. The seven zones of the old corporation limits have about 260 parks, many of which suffer poor maintenance. The city has a per capita park space of 0.41 sq m, which is the least among all metros in India. The eight zones in the newly added areas of the city have about 265 locations that have been identified for development of new parks. The largest park is the 358-acre Tholkappia Poonga, developed to restore the fragile ecosystem of the Adyar estuary. The horticulture department-owned Semmoli Poonga is a 20-acre downtown botanical garden.

Chennai houses several theme parks, namely MGM Dizzee World and Queen's Land. However, several fatal accidents have occurred in the theme parks. Wonderla plans to open an amusement park in 2017. Other important recreation centres include Madras Boat Club, which is over 140 years old, and Gymkhana Club, which is famous for its 18-hole golf courses. Built in 1867, Madras Boat Club is the second-oldest surviving Indian rowing club.

Shopping

Chennai is home to several malls, due to its status as an IT hub. Major ones include Express Avenue (EA), Citi Centre, Abirami mega mall, Spencer Plaza, Ampa Skywalk, Phoenix Market City and Forum Vijaya Mall. Chennai is an important gold market in India contributing to 45 percent of the 800-tonne annual national gold uptake. The city is also the base to the World Gold Council's India operations. The city's retail industry is majorly concentrated in T. Nagar which accounts for major share jewellery and clothes sold in Chennai. According to the 2012 report by property consultant Cushman & Wakefield, Main Streets Across the World, Khader Nawaz Khan Road at Nungambakkam ranked 10th position in the list of 'Top 10 Global Highest Retail Rental Growth Markets 2012', with 36.7 percent jump in rents.

Transport

Air

The Chennai International Airport is the fourth-busiest in India in terms of passenger traffic behind New Delhi, Mumbai and Bengaluru. It handled about 15.2 million passengers in 2013–2014; in terms of international passengers, Chennai is the third-busiest airport behind Indira Gandhi International Airport, Delhi, and Chatrapati Shivaji International Airport, Mumbai. Chennai handles 400 flights a day, again placing it fourth among Indian airports. The city is connected to major hubs across Asia, Europe, Middle East and Africa through more than 30 national and international carriers.

The new airport is said to be likely to handle cargo spillover traffic from the existing one.

Rail
 
Chennai hosts the headquarters of the Southern Railway. The city has four main railway terminals. Chennai Central, Chennai Egmore, Chennai Beach and Tambaram. Chennai Central station, the city's largest, provides nationwide access, whereas Chennai Egmore provides access to destinations primarily within Tamil Nadu; however, it also handles a few inter–state trains. A fifth terminal has been proposed to decongest Chennai Central. The Chennai suburban railway network, one of the oldest in the country, facilitates transportation within the city. It consists of four  broad gauge sectors terminating at two locations in the city, namely Chennai Central and Chennai Beach. While three sectors are operated on-grade, the fourth sector is primarily an elevated corridor, linking Chennai Beach to Velachery and is connected with the rest of the rail network.

Metro 

Chennai Metro is a rapid-transit system serving the city and was partially commenced on 29 June 2015. To improve the city's public transportation system and prepare the city for the future commuting needs, the Chennai Metro was planned and approved by the state cabinet during 2007 for which construction began on 2009. Phase I of the Chennai Metro network consists of the Blue Line and the Green Line covering a length of 45.1 kilometres (28.0 mi) consisting of 40 stations with Alandur and Chennai Central serving as interchanges. 55% of the corridors in Phase I are underground and the rest are elevated. As of March 2023, the entire Phase 1 stretching from Chennai Central to Alandur on the Green line and Wimco Nagar to Chennai International Airport on Blue line are operational, bringing the total operational network over 45 km. With this, the entirety of Phase I is operational. In December 2016, the  Chennai Metro Rail Limited (CMRL) announced the Phase-2 of Chennai Metro for a length of 104 km consisting of 104 stations, subject to approval from the State and Central governments. The Phase 2 was subsequently approved in late 2018, with certain provisos, and soil testing for various stations, which are now under construction since 2019. As of April 2019, ridership has risen considerably to around 100,000 daily commuters, post the inaugural of the entire Phase I. Phase I-A, which is an extension of the Blue line from Washermanpet to Thiruvottiyur was inaugurated in 2021.

Road

As of 2019, the city corporation maintains about 471 bus route roads and 33,0000 interior roads. The Chennai–Mumbai and Chennai–Kolkata prongs of the Golden Quadrilateral system of National Highways start from the city. In addition, four major National Highways (NH), namely, NH 4 to Mumbai (via Bangalore and Pune), NH 5 to Kolkata (linked via NH 6) (via Visakhapatnam and Bhubaneswar), NH 45 to Theni (via Villupuram, Tiruchirapalli and Dindigul) and NH 205 to Madanapalle (via Tirupati) originate in the city, connecting it to other Indian cities. Chennai is connected to other parts of the state and the Union Territory of Puducherry by state highways.

The government has constructed grade separators and flyovers at major intersections, and built Inner Ring Road and Outer Ring Road. The Gemini flyover, built in 1973, crosses over the arterial road, and eases the traffic movements towards Anna Salai and towards the Kathipara Flyover. , according to the Transport Department, there were 25.8 lakh two–wheelers and 5.6 lakh four–wheelers in the city, and the Metropolitan Transport Corporation (MTC) bus fleet were 3,421, equaling 0.1% of all vehicles in the city.

Bus transport

When opened, the Chennai Mofussil Bus Terminus (CMBT) was the largest bus station in Asia. It is the main intercity bus station of Chennai, administered by seven government-owned transport corporations, which operate intercity and interstate bus services. There are many private bus companies. The MTC provides an exclusive intracity bus service, consisting of 3,421 buses on 724 routes, which provides transportation to 55.2 lakh passengers daily. The Tamil Nadu State Transport Corporation operates Volvo air-conditioned services from Chennai to nearby Pondicherry, Vellore, Hosur and Trichy.

Other modes
The other means of road transport in the city include vans, regionally known as Maxi Cabs, auto rickshaws, on-call metered taxis and tourist taxis.

The Chennai ORR is 62.3 km long connecting NH 45 (GST Road) at Perungalathur, NH 4 (GWT Road) at Nazarathpet, NH 205 (CTH Road) at Nemilicherry (Thiruninravur), NH 5 (GNT Road) at Nallur and TPP road at Minjur under the process by Chennai Metropolitan Area.

Chennai has currently one expressway–the Chennai Outer Ring Road. In the coming years, the city will get more expressways, which will connect other cities of India, resulting in better connectivity and commute with the rest of the country. They are as follows:

Chennai Port–Maduravoyal Expressway: Under construction since 2013, to be completed by December 2024.
Bangalore–Chennai Expressway: Under construction since August 2019, to be completed by March 2024.
Chennai–Salem Expressway: Proposed, to be completed by December 2025.
Surat–Chennai Expressway: Proposed, to be completed by December 2026.

Sea

The city is served by two major ports, Chennai Port, one of the largest artificial ports in India, and Ennore Port. Chennai Port is the largest in the Bay of Bengal, with an annual cargo tonnage of 61.46 million (2010–2011), and the second-largest container-hub in India, with an annual container volume of 1.523 million TEUs (2010–2011). The port handles transportation of automobiles, motorcycles and general industrial cargo. The Ennore Port with an annual cargo tonnage of 11.01 million (2010–2011), handles coal, ore and other bulk and rock mineral products. Royapuram fishing harbour is used by fishing boats and Kattupalli Shipyard near Ennore Port was inaugurated in January 2013.

Media

Newspaper publishing started in Chennai with the launch of a weekly, The Madras Courier, in 1785. It was followed by the weeklies The Madras Gazette and The Government Gazette in 1795. The Spectator, founded in 1836, was the first English newspaper in Chennai to be owned by an Indian and became the city's first daily newspaper in 1853. The first Tamil newspaper, Swadesamitran, was launched in 1899. First Telugu journal printed from Madras was Satya Doota in 1835 and Andhra Patrika found in 1908 was the most successful Telugu newspaper from Madras.

The major English dailies published in Chennai are The Hindu, The New Indian Express, The Deccan Chronicle and The Times of India and many more. The evening dailies are, The Trinity Mirror and News Today. , The Hindu was the city's most read English newspaper, with a daily circulation of 267,349. The major business dailies published from the city are The Economic Times, The Hindu Business Line, Business Standard, Mint and The Financial Express. The major Tamil dailies include the Dina Thanthi, Dinakaran, Dina Mani, Dina Malar, The Hindu Tamil, Tamil Murasu, Makkal Kural and Malai Malar. Malayala Manorama and Mathrubhumi are the major Malayalam dailies while major Telugu dailies include Eenadu, Vaartha, Andhra Jyothi and Sakshi. The one and only Hindi Newspaper published from Chennai is the Rajasthan Patrika. The Local weekly Newspapers circulated to residents are T. Nagar Times, Pillar Times, Arcot Road Talk, Chrompet Times. Chennai's First Corporate Leisure Newspaper, The Shopping Express. Magazines published from Chennai include Ananda Vikatan, Kumudam, Kalki, Kungumam, Puthiya Thalaimurai, Thuglak, Frontline and Sportstar

Doordarshan runs two terrestrial television channels and two satellite television channels from its Chennai centre, which was set up in 1974. Private Tamil satellite television networks such as Sun TV, Raj TV, Zee Tamizh, Star Vijay, Jaya TV, Makkal TV, Vasanth TV, Kalaignar TV, Captain TV and PuthiyaThalaimurai TV broadcast out of Chennai. The Sun Network one of India's largest broadcasting companies is based in the city. While the cable TV service is entirely controlled by the state government, direct–to–home (DTH) is available via DD Direct Plus, Dish TV, Tata Sky, Videocon DTH, Sun direct DTH, Reliance Big TV and Digital TV. Chennai is the first city in India to have implemented the Conditional Access System for cable television. Radio broadcasting began in 1924 by the Madras Presidency Radio Club. The radio station at the Rippon Buildings complex was founded in 1930 and was then shifted to All India Radio in 1938. The city has four AM and 11 FM radio stations operated by All India Radio, Anna University and Suryan FM, Radio Mirchi, BIG FM, Hello FM, Radio City, Radio One among others.

Education

Chennai is home to some of the best educational institutions in the country. The city ranks second among Indian metropolitan city centres with a 90.33 percent literacy rate. Chennai has a mix of public and private schools, some of which also receive financial support from the government.

The public school system is managed by the Chennai Corporation with an enrollment of 142,387 students in over 330 schools. Tamil and English are the primary medium of instruction, though some schools also use Telugu and Urdu as medium of instruction in their schools. Public schools run by the Chennai Corporation are all affiliated with the Tamil Nadu State Board, while private schools may be affiliated with either of the Tamil Nadu Board of Secondary Education or the Central Board of Secondary Education (CBSE). A few schools are affiliated with the Council for the Indian School Certificate Examinations, the National Institute of Open Schooling (NIOS) board or the Montessori system. Education in Chennai starts with two years of Kindergarten from age three onward and then follows the Indian 10+2+3 plan, ten years of school, two years of higher secondary education, and three years of undergraduate education.

English is the medium of instruction in the majority of institutions for higher education. The University of Madras, founded in 1857, is one of India's first three modern universities. Colleges for science, arts, and commerce degrees are typically affiliated with the University of Madras, which has six campuses in the city. The Indian Institute of Technology Madras (IIT Madras) and the College of Engineering, Guindy, Anna University are two well-known centres for engineering education in the city. The Indian Army's Officers Training Academy is also headquartered in the city.

Chennai has a plethora of libraries, including British Council Library, American Library, Connemara Public Library, and Anna Centenary Library. The Connemara Public Library is one of four National Depository Centres in India that receive a copy of all newspapers and books published in the country. The Anna Centenary Library is the largest library in Asia.

Chennai has two CSIR research institutions namely Central Leather Research Institute and Structural Engineering Research Centre. Chennai Book Fair, an annual book fair organised in Chennai by the Booksellers and Publishers Association of South India (BAPASI), is the largest exhibition for Tamil book publishers to display their books. The fair is typically held for about 10 days between the last week of December and the third week of January.

Sports and recreation

Cricket is the most popular sport in Chennai. It was introduced in 1864 with the foundation of the Madras Cricket Club. The M.A. Chidambaram Stadium established in 1916 is among the oldest cricket stadiums in India. The stadium was also one of the venues of the 1987,1996 and 2011 ICC Cricket World Cups. Chemplast Cricket Ground located at the IIT Madras campus is another important venue for cricket matches. Prominent cricketers from the city include former cricket captains S. Venkataraghavan and Kris Srikkanth. A cricket fast bowling academy called the MRF Pace Foundation, whose coaches include T. A. Sekhar and Glenn Mcgrath, is based in Chennai. Being home to the Indian Premier League (IPL) cricket team Chennai Super Kings, the city hosted the finals of the IPL's 2011 and 2012 series.

The city's professional football club Chennaiyin FC competes in Indian Super League, the country's top tier association football league associated with Asian Football Federation and recognized by FIFA. The club uses the Jawaharlal Nehru Stadium nicknamed the Marina Arena as their home ground and are champions of the Indian Super League in 2015 and 2018.

Chennai was the venue of the 1995 South Asian Games. Chennai is home to a World Series Hockey (WSH) team, the Chennai Cheetahs. The Mayor Radhakrishnan Stadium is associated with hockey and was venue for the international hockey tournament the 2005 Men's Champions Trophy and the 2007 Men's Asia Cup. The Jawaharlal Nehru Stadium is associated for hosting Football and athletic competitions, it also houses a multi–purpose indoor complex for competition in volleyball, basketball and table tennis. Water sports are played in the Velachery Aquatic Complex. Tennis sport is popularising among the city youths, Since 1997 Chennai has been host to the only ATP World Tour event held in India, the Chennai Open which has been shifted to Pune as Maharashtra Open from 2017. Vijay Amritraj, Mahesh Bhupathi Ramesh Krishnan and Somdev Devvarman are tennis players from Chennai.
Chennai is home to Chennai Slam, two-time national champion of India's top professional basketball division, the UBA Pro Basketball League.

Madras Boat Club (founded in 1846) and the Royal Madras Yacht Club (founded by Sir Francis Spring in 1911) promote the sailing sports in Chennai, and organise national and international sailing events. Automobile racing in India has been closely connected with Chennai since its beginnings shortly after independence. Motor racing events are held on a special purpose track in Madras Motor Race Track, Sriperumbudur, which has also been the venue for several international competitions. Formula One driver Karun Chandhok was born in Chennai.

Horse racing is held at the Guindy Race Course, while rowing competitions are hosted at the Madras Boat Club. The city has two 18-hole golf courses, the Cosmopolitan Club and the Gymkhana Club, both established in the late nineteenth century. The city has a rugby union team called the Chennai Cheetahs.

Home to the country's first international chess master, the first grandmaster, the first female grandmaster, the first international arbiter, and 12 of the 34 world chess grandmasters from India, Chennai is often dubbed "India's chess capital". Former world chess champion Viswanathan Anand grew up and resides in Chennai. Other sports persons of repute from Chennai include table tennis players Sharath Kamal and two–time world carrom champion, Maria Irudayam. Chennai was the host of the World Chess Championship 2013 match between Viswanathan Anand and Magnus Carlsen. In 2022, Chennai hosted the 44th Chess Olympiad, in which 1,400 players from across 187 countries will participate.

City based teams

International relations

Foreign missions

The consular presence in the city dates back to 1794, when William Abbott was appointed US consular agent for South India. , there were 43 foreign representations in Chennai, including consulates general, deputy high commissions and honorary consulates. The American Consulate in Chennai is one of the top adjudication posts in the world and the number one in processing employment-based visas. It was ranked among the top globally in issuing 'L' and 'H' category visas for workers and professionals and was ranked eighth globally in terms of all category of visas being issued.

The Foreigners Regional Registration Office (FRRO), which is the office of the field officers in charge of immigration and registration activities in the city, is located at Shastri Bhavan at Haddows Road.

Twin towns – Sister cities

Chennai has sister city relationships with the following cities of the world:

See also
Areas of Chennai
List of people from Chennai
Timeline of Chennai history

Notes

References

External links
Official website of Chennai district
Official website of the Corporation of Chennai 

Chennai Encyclopædia Britannica entry

  

 
Cities and towns in Chennai district
Metropolitan cities in India
Populated coastal places in India
Port cities in India
Coromandel Coast
Populated places established in the 1640s
1640s establishments in Asia
Smart cities in India